Șintereag is a commune in Bistrița-Năsăud County, Transylvania, Romania. It is composed of seven villages: Blăjenii de Jos (Alsóbalázsfalva), Blăjenii de Sus (Felsőbalázsfalva), Caila (Kajla), Cociu (Szamoskócs), Șieu-Sfântu (Sajószentandrás), Șintereag and Șintereag-Gară (Somkeréki állomás).

Natives
Grigore Bălan (1896–1944), Brigadier General during World War II
Nicolae Bălan (1882–1955), metropolitan bishop of the Romanian Orthodox Church

References

Communes in Bistrița-Năsăud County
Localities in Transylvania